Tania Van Heer (born 30 December 1970) is an Australian sprinter who won two gold medals at the 1998 Commonwealth Games in Kuala Lumpur.

Athletics career
A junior prodigy, born in Sri Lanka (her Sri Lankan 200m women Under 18 record that established in 1986 with 24.8s held for 32 years until it was broken by Shelinda Jansen in 2018), Van Heer won the Under-20 sprint treble (100 metres, 200 metres, 400 metres) at the 1988 Australian Championships in Athletics.

Badly affected by injury through most of her career, Van Heer was selected to represent Australia internationally on six occasions.

During her best years (1998–99), when coached by 1950 Commonwealth Games gold medalist, Scotchy Gordon, Van Heer won a bronze medal over 100 metres at the 1998 Commonwealth Games, followed by two gold medals as part of Australia's victorious 4 × 100 metres and 4 × 400 metres relay teams.

In 1999, although again hampered by injuries, Van Heer ran in the 1999 World Championships in Athletics, just failing to make the final of the 200 metres.  She also ran well in the 4 × 400 metres relay for Australia.

Van Heer was again injured during 2000 and was unable to qualify for Australia's Olympic team.

Van Heer attempted an international comeback in 2006 for the Commonwealth Games in Melbourne, having had children by that time. Despite finishing fourth in the official 100 metres trial, she was not chosen in the Games team.

Personal life
Her son Aidan Murphy is also an athlete who competes in sprint events and represented Australia in the 200 metres at the 2022 World Athletics Championships.

Relay teams
Van Heer has won a number of international medals in 4 × 100 metre and 4 × 400 metre relays:

 In Kuala Lumpur 1998, Van Heer led off the Australian 4 × 100 metres relay team of Lauren Hewitt, Nova Peris-Kneebone and Sharon Cripps to win the Commonwealth Games event.
 Shortly afterwards, Van Heer joined with Lee Naylor, Tamsyn Lewis and Susan Andrews to win the 4 × 400 metres relay in a time of 3-27.28s.
 At the 1999 World Indoor Championships in Maebashi, Van Heer combined with Susan Andrews, Tamsyn Lewis and Cathy Freeman to win a silver medal in an Australian record of 3-26.87.

Statistics

Personal bests
 as at 10 March 2008

Yearly progression
 as at 10 March 2008

References

1970 births
Living people
Australian female sprinters
Commonwealth Games gold medallists for Australia
Athletes (track and field) at the 1998 Commonwealth Games
Sportswomen from South Australia
Australian people of Sri Lankan descent
Athletes from Adelaide
Commonwealth Games bronze medallists for Australia
Commonwealth Games medallists in athletics
World Athletics Indoor Championships medalists
21st-century Australian women
20th-century Australian women
Medallists at the 1998 Commonwealth Games